Abdul Wahid was a citizen of Afghanistan whose autopsy was held in the United States's Bagram Theater detention facility.
He was beaten to death on November 6, 2003.

Army pathologist Colonel Kathleen Ingwersen concluded his death was a homicide.
She wrote on his death certificate that he died from "Multiple blunt force injuries complicated by probable rhabdomyolysis [extensive crush injuries of the muscles]."

Abdul Wahid's cousin Abdul Haleem reported that he was also apprehended, and tortured, on November 3, 2003.
He and Abdul Wahid's father attributed the abuse to Afghan soldiers, but said American soldiers were aware of the abuse, and didn't intervene.

Abdul Wahid's father said his heavily scarred body was returned to his family two months after his capture, together with a letter from US authorities. According to the Associated Press:

Human rights worker John Sifton, of Human Rights Watch, told the Associated Press that corrupt security officials in Afghanistan routinely captured men, and threatened to hand them over to the US in return for a bounty, unless they paid a bribe.

On January 16, 2010, the Department of Defense was forced to publish the names of the 645 captives held in the Bagram Theater Internment Facility.
One of the individuals on the list was named "Abdul Wahid".

References

Year of birth missing
2003 deaths
Deaths by beating
Bagram Theater Internment Facility detainees
Afghan extrajudicial prisoners of the United States
Afghan murder victims
People murdered in Afghanistan
Extrajudicial prisoners killed while in United States custody
Afghan people who died in prison custody